Tissanga zambiana is a moth in the family Eupterotidae. It was described by Philippe Darge and Robert Minetti in 2012. It is found in Malawi and Zambia.

References

Moths described in 2012
Eupterotidae